Claiborne Henry Bryant (November 16, 1911 – April 9, 1999) was a pitcher in Major League Baseball who played from 1935 through 1940 for the Chicago Cubs. He was born in Madison Heights, Virginia.

Bryant spent parts of six seasons in the Minor Legues before joining the Cubs in 1935. His most productive season came in 1938, when he won 19 games with a 3.10 earned run average and led the National League with 135 strikeouts, while pitching seven consecutive complete games, winning six of them in the first 25 days in September, to help the Cubs erase a nine-game deficit and capture an unlikely pennant.

Bryant went 32–20 with a 3.73 ERA in parts of six seasons for the Cubs. He began to experience elbow and shoulder pain, and this led to his retirement from baseball in 1940.

Bryant was an exceptionally good hitting pitcher in his six-year major league career, posting a .266 batting average (51-for-192), scoring 48 runs, with 5 home runs and 28 RBI.

Afterwards, Bryant was a longtime manager in the Brooklyn/Los Angeles Dodgers minor league system, and also served as a pitching coach for the Dodgers in 1961 and the Cleveland Indians in 1967 and 1974. He also was a roving pitching instructor in the Cleveland organization. Ned Garver said he learned the fundamentals of pitching from Bryant when he managed the Newark Moundsmen.

Bryant managed winter ball for the Leones del Caracas club of the Venezuelan League, guiding his team to the 1956–1957 pennant while advancing to the 1957 Caribbean Series.

Bryant died in 1999 in Boca Raton, Florida, at the age of 87.

See also

 List of Major League Baseball annual strikeout leaders

References

External links
, or SABR Biography Project

1911 births
1999 deaths
Asheville Tourists managers
Baseball players from Virginia
Birmingham Barons players
Burlington Bees players
Caribbean Series managers
Chambersburg Young Yanks players
Chicago Cubs players
Cleveland Indians coaches
Keokuk Indians players
Los Angeles Angels (minor league) managers
Los Angeles Dodgers coaches
Major League Baseball pitchers
Major League Baseball pitching coaches
Montreal Royals managers
National League strikeout champions
New Orleans Pelicans (baseball) players
People from Madison Heights, Virginia
Portland Beavers managers
Springfield Senators players
St. Paul Saints (AA) managers
Tulsa Oilers (baseball) players
Zanesville Cubs players
Zanesville Greys players
American expatriate baseball people in Venezuela
Zanesville Dodgers players